Dead Birds is a 2004 American Western horror film directed by Alex Turner, and starring Henry Thomas, Nicki Aycox, Isaiah Washington, Patrick Fugit, and Michael Shannon. The film centers on a group of deserters turned bank robbers who come face-to-face with supernatural forces while holing up in an abandoned plantation after robbing a bank.

The film was given a limited re-release on February 5, 2010, at the NuArt Theatre in Los Angeles; and received mixed reviews from critics.

Plot
William is the leader of a group of Confederate deserters during the American Civil War which includes his younger brother Sam, Clyde, and Joseph. With the help of Todd, an escaped slave, and Annabelle, an army nurse, they stage a robbery at a bank holding a cache of Union gold coins, and multiple townsfolk are violently murdered by the group during the plundering. 

Needing a place to rest for the night, the criminals set up camp in a plantation 
house overlooking an abandoned plantation. En route through the fields, they find a strange scarecrow, which they believe is actually a crucified man, and shoot a strange deformed creature. It soon becomes obvious that the old house is not as empty as they thought. The former owner was a gentleman farmer named Hollister with a wife and two children. When his wife died, he attempted to bring her back by sacrificing his children, slaves, and any other living creature, hoping that black magic acquired from his slaves' native rites would return her to life. However, this simply allowed evil spirits to take over his victims, and these remain in the house, attacking all who dare enter. When the locals found out about his demonic practices,  they crucified the farmer in his fields so he would suffer by the very curse he unleashed (he is the scarecrow the group found when they first arrived).

A storm is coming so Joseph leads the horses into the barn. When he goes to the well to get some water, he gets pulled in by one of the spirits. The others try to find him but fail to do so.

The others also experience strange occurrences. While resting in the bedroom, Sam is haunted by the ghost of the farmer, who shows him what happened, and Todd witnesses the ghost of a slave being sacrificed in the basement. Clyde witnesses what appears to be Joseph stumbling about outside and goes to investigate. William and Annabelle, who are guarding the gold, wake up to find it gone and think Clyde took off with it. While William tries to track down Clyde, Sam is possessed by the farmer and shows Annabelle what happened. The ritual turned the farmer's family into demonic creatures similar to the one they killed when they first arrived. Sam dies soon afterwards and Annabelle tries to convince William to leave. Todd also reunites with the pair and is also determined to leave.

When they reach the barn, they find the horses torn to pieces. Todd begins to hear and see things the other two cannot and he tries to leave. William refuses to leave without the gold and is accompanied by Annabelle back into the house to find Sam's body missing. In the field, a possessed Sam attacks Todd, throwing him into the air where he vanishes into thin air. When William and Annabelle go into the fields as well, they find Clyde, now dead and possessed by one of the spirits, crucified like a scarecrow with his eyes and mouth sewn shut. As they try to flee, William accidentally shoots Annabelle, killing her instantly.

The next morning, William finally leaves Annabelle's corpse behind. He is attacked by their dog and tries to run away. When William clears the fields, he is shot by a group of Confederate soldiers. It is then revealed that William has also transformed into a demonic creature and the soldiers mistook him for some deformed animal. Two of the soldiers discover two gold coins which William dropped and go to investigate the house. As they walk through the fields, they discover the corpse of another demonic creature dead body, presumably that of Annabelle. They continue to the plantation house. Fade to black.

Cast

Release
Dead Birds screened at the 2004 Toronto International Film Festival. It was given a limited re-release on February 5, 2010, at the NuArt Theatre in Los Angeles.

Home media
The film was released on DVD by Columbia TriStar on March 15, 2005.

Reception
On review aggregator Rotten Tomatoes, Dead Birds holds a score of 50%, based on 8 reviews, with an average score of 5.37/10. Jon Condit of Dread Central said of the film, "And wouldn't ya know it, this modestly budgeted period piece from newcomer Alex Turner dishes on the history (we're in the late-1800s for this one) as well as some heavy gore and otherworldly Lovecraftian heebie-jeebies for a mostly satisfying feast. That is, if you can withstand its unhurried storytelling pace these tales of America's yesteryear can't seem to shake (it ain't no Glory, I'll say that much)." Cam Lindsay of Exclaim! said, "The Wild Wild West isn't the norm for a horror film setting, but first-time director Turner and writer Simon Barrett have come up with a nice horror/western hybrid to make their little flick an extraordinary one."

Daniel W. Kelly of DVD Talk said, "Of course, the film follows some conventions of horror. There's a cornfield. There are demons and scary creatures. A group of people in a desolate location get offed one by one. But that's what we love about horror. The only other real issue is that while the ending is good conceptually, it could be considered sort of anticlimactic visually. Still, this film is worth the goose bumps it delivers throughout due to stylish camera work and a visually frightening presentation." Brian McKay from eFilmCritic.com gave the film 4/5 stars, writing, "Dead Birds is the kind of horror film that straddles the line between mediocrity and quality, ultimately landing on the "quality" side thanks to several elements that help to elevate it above its standard horror trappings. When you're making a basic haunted house tale, it's important to have a good cast and some prime real estate to shoot it on, two elements that are abundantly present here." Arrow in the Head rated the film 6/10, commending the film's acting, atmosphere, direction, and soundtrack, while criticizing the film's occasional slow moments and weak CGI.

Robert Koehler from Variety gave the film a negative review, criticizing the film's lack of scares, overly extended scenes, and repetitive visual effects, writing, "[the] Concept of transplanting horror genre tropes into the Civil War's bloody soil is about as inspired as the dull Dead Birds ever gets."

References

External links
 
 
 

2004 films
2004 horror films
2000s Western (genre) horror films
American Civil War films
American Western (genre) horror films
American supernatural horror films
Backwoods slasher films
Films about deserters
Films set in 1863
Films set in Alabama
Films set in abandoned houses
Films shot in Alabama
Films shot in Mobile, Alabama
Films with screenplays by Simon Barrett (filmmaker)
Period horror films
Supernatural slasher films
2000s English-language films
2000s American films